Claudio Javier Poggi (born 7 October 1963) is an Argentine accountant and peronist politician. From 2017 to 2021, he sat in the Argentine Senate representing San Luis, the province he led as governor from 2011 to 2015. He currently serves as a National Deputy since 2019, and previously held the same office from 2003 to 2009.

Life and times
Poggi was born in Alcira Gigena, a rural community near Río Cuarto, Córdoba. He enrolled at the National University of Río Cuarto, earning a degree in Accountancy. He married Sandra Correa, and they had two children. They relocated to neighboring San Luis Province, and in 1991 Poggi entered public service as Representative for San Luis at the Federal Investment Council (CFI). He then served in a managerial capacity at the local Acindar steel mill. Governor Adolfo Rodríguez Saá appointed him Undersecretary of the Economy in 1995, and in 1999, Minister of Economy and Public Works.

He served as Undersecretary of Interministerial Coordination during Adolfo Rodríguez Saá's brief turn as interim President appointed on an emergency basis by Congress in December 2001. Poggi returned to San Luis as Minister of Economy and Public Works for Governor Alicia Lemme, and in 2003 was elected to the Argentine Chamber of Deputies. He concomitantly served as Minister of Public Works and Tourism for Lemme's successor, Governor Alberto Rodríguez Saá. Poggi was elected to the San Luis Provincial Legislature in 2009, serving as the chamber's president until July 2010, when he accepted an appointment as Head of the Cabinet of Ministers in Rodríguez Saá's administration.

He was endorsed by the governor to run as his successor in 2011 on the Federal Commitment ticket, a center-right faction of the Justicialist Party whose strength in greatest in San Luis. He was thus elected governor, winning nearly 58% of the vote and defeating the runner-up, Front for Victory candidate Alfonso Vergés, by 32%. His victory represented the eighth consecutive election won by a Rodríguez Saá or close ally since democracy was restored in Argentina in 1983; Poggi stressed his wish to maintain continuity in the province, one of Argentina's fastest growing, citing the Rodríguez Saá administrations as "models to follow".

External links
  Province of San Luis
  Office of the Governor of San Luis

References

1963 births
Living people
People from Córdoba Province, Argentina
Argentine people of Italian descent
Argentine accountants
Members of the Argentine Chamber of Deputies elected in San Luis
Members of the Argentine Senate for San Luis
Governors of San Luis Province
Justicialist Party politicians